The 12 Hours of Sebring is an annual motorsport endurance race for sports cars held at Sebring International Raceway, on the site of the former Hendricks Army Airfield World War II air base in Sebring, Florida, US. In the past, this race has been a round of the now defunct World Sportscar Championship, IMSA GT Championship and American Le Mans Series. In 2012, the race was the opening event of the FIA World Endurance Championship in a one off race before being returned back to the American Le Mans Series for 2013. Starting in 2014, the event became the second round of the WeatherTech SportsCar Championship.

The race has historically been considered to be one of the three legs of the informal Triple crown of endurance racing along with the 24 Hours of Le Mans and 24 Hours of Daytona.

History
The track opened in 1950 on an airfield and is a road racing course styled after those used in European Grand Prix motor racing. The first race was a six-hour race on New Year's Eve 1950. The winning car is currently on display at the Edge Motor Museum in Memphis, Tennessee. The next race held 14 months later as the first 12 Hours of Sebring. The race is famous for its "once around the clock" action, starting during the day and finishing at night. From 1953 to 1972 the 12 Hour was a round of the FIA's premier sports car series which was contested under various names including the World Sportscar Championship and the International Championship for Makes. In the 1950's, in addition to Le Mans, Sebring was on the calendar at the same time now-legendary races such as the Mille Miglia, Targa Florio, Carrera Panamericana and the RAC Tourist Trophy were on the World Sportscar Championship calendar, such was the prestige of the Sebring race. It was also the most important American race for the European teams and drivers and was the center of European racing activity in the United States, as it was the only time during the 1950's that the big European manufacturer teams and drivers came to the United States in force, and with that brought a lot of international media attention- the United States Formula One Grand Prix was not run until 1959. Top drivers who competed on the European circuit in the 1950's such as Juan Manuel Fangio, Alberto Ascari, Nino Farina, Stirling Moss and Mike Hawthorn all raced at Sebring, and the 1957 Sebring 12 Hours was the only American race the 5-time world champion Fangio ever won.

In its early years, the Sebring circuit combined former airport runways with narrow two-lane service roads. The 1966 event was a turning point in Sebring history, as the facilities and the safety of the circuit were heavily criticized. Five people were killed during the race, which was more people killed than in the race's prior 15-year history combined. Bob McLean crashed while approaching the hairpin; his car rolled several times, struck a utility pole and then exploded, landing in a ditch and killing McLean. In another incident Mario Andretti in his Ferrari 365 P2 tangled with Don Wester's Porsche 906 on the Warehouse Straight near the Webster Turns, killing four spectators and then crashing into a warehouse next to the track. Subsequent to these events, the facilities were upgraded and the circuit layout was changed, including eliminating the Webster Turns and creating the Green Park Chicane further down the track to move the straight further away from the airport warehouses. The circuit was made safer, and since then there have only been 4 fatalities since then- a remarkable record for a circuit of Sebring's age.

It is known as preparation for the 24 Hours of Le Mans, as the track's technical layout and extremely bumpy surface, combined with south-central Florida's perennial hot weather, is a major test of a car's reliability- teams planning to compete at Le Mans regard Sebring as an ideal preparation run for the prestigious French race. In recent years, six overall victories have been achieved by the Audi R8, one fewer than the record seven wins of the Porsche 935.

Tom Kristensen has won the race more times than anyone else, with six victories—in 1999–2000, 2005–2006, 2009 and in 2012.

2020 saw the race be rescheduled to mid-November due to delays caused by the pandemic. It was also the first occurrence of the race behind closed doors.
 
Races up until 1969 began with the traditional Le Mans start procedure, which was abolished at the end of the 1969 season following Jacky Ickx protesting at Le Mans 1969; 1970 was the first 12 Hours of Sebring started with a rolling start.

Race results

The 1966 race had Dan Gurney leading at the last lap, when his engine of his Shelby American Ford GT40 Mk II seized near the end.  Gurney pushed his car over the finish line, beaten only by Ken Miles and Lloyd Ruby.  However, his actions were ultimately determined to be against the rules and he did not receive credit for his finish. 
 
In 2005, the Chevrolet Corvette C6.R and Aston Martin DBR9 made their race debut in the hotly contested GT1 class, with Aston Martin winning its class for the first time in 49 years at Sebring ahead of the two Corvettes. Corvette had dominated the class the past three years with its previous generation C5R.

The all-new Audi R10 TDI won the 2006 edition of the race, the car's first ever run in competition. The much-hyped Porsche RS Spyder campaigned by Penske Racing dropped to take 2nd place in its LMP2 class, behind the Intersport Lola car. The GT1 Corvette C6R team got their revenge against the Aston Martin, although the second Corvette came within 1/3 of a second of the podium in the closing laps of the race.

2007 saw Audi again winning in the R10 TDI despite requiring more frequent refueling due to changes in American Le Mans series rules intended to even the field between gasoline and diesel-powered engines.

Statistics

Wins by manufacturer

Wins by driver

Overall winners

 The car was in fact, a Porsche 935 K3 that has been modified with a single plug cylinder head and a front nose to resemble a Porsche 934 to comply to IMSA GTO specification.
 These races were stopped for a period of time due to heavy rain and/or accidents.  The race clock was not stopped for these periods and counted towards the 12 Hours.
 Race record for most distance covered.
 Technically the race "winner" in 1950 was the Crosley Hot Shot of Fritz Koster / Ralph Deshon, entered by Victor Sharpe Jr. of Tampa. While the Wacker / Burrell Allard did cover more distance, the race was run under the "Index of Performance" handicapping rules and the Crosley, with a much smaller engine than the Cadillac-powered Allard, is listed in the Official Sebring Record Book as the winner.

References

External links 
Official Homepage
United SportsCar Championship official site

 
Sports car races
Auto races in the United States
Recurring sporting events established in 1950
1950 establishments in Florida